James Songok (born 23 July 1970) is a Kenyan male long-distance runner who competed in cross country, track and road running.

He began his career focusing on track running and after a bronze medal in the 10,000 metres at the 1988 World Junior Championships in Athletics, he went on to win the 5000 metres title at the Kenyan Athletics Championships, then the gold medal in that event at the 1992 African Championships in Athletics.

Songok represented Kenya at the IAAF World Cross Country Championships on three occasions. He helped the Kenyan men to the team title in both 1994 and 1995, taking sixth then seventh place, respectively. He was picked for a third time running, but managed on 23rd place in the 1996 race. He attempted to convert to road races thereafter but, after moderate success of fourth at the Stramilano and second at the Puy-en-Velay 15K, he ceased competing after the 1997 season.

Personal bests
3000 metres – 7:52.20 (1994)
5000 metres – 13:24.63 (1992)
10,000 metres – 28:50.42 (1988)
Half marathon – 1:03:53 (2000)

International competitions

National titles
Kenyan Athletics Championships
5000 m: 1990

See also
List of champions of the African Championships in Athletics

References

External links

Living people
1970 births
Kenyan male long-distance runners
Kenyan male cross country runners